Rathgormack or Rathgormac is a village and parish in northern County Waterford, Ireland.

Amenities

The village has a pub, a shop, a newly made all-weather pitch, a recreational park, a national school and a Roman Catholic Church

Rathgormack made national headlines in 2021 when, to avoid the loss of the village's last pub,19 locals invested €12,000 each and formed a company to purchase it.

Geography
The closest centres of population to Rathgormack are the County Tipperary towns of Carrick-on-Suir and Clonmel. It is the twin parish of Clonea-Power.

The population of the area is around 1200. Farming and agriculture-related industries are the main sources of employment. Tourism is also important, with a hiking centre located in the village. It caters mainly for hikers to the nearby Comeragh Mountains. The town is overlooked by Cruachán Paorach.

History 
In 1921, during the Irish War of Independence, a District Inspector of the Royal Irish Constabulary, Gilbert Potter was executed by Dinny Lacey of the Third Tipperary Brigade of the Irish Republican Army (IRA) on the banks of the River Clodagh, about 1 km south of the village.

See also
 List of towns and villages in Ireland

References

External links
Rathgormack National School
Website: https://www.rathgormack.ie 

Towns and villages in County Waterford